The Gurdwara Shahid Ganj Singh Singhania, also known as Gurdwara Shaheedganj Singh Singhnian, is a historic Sikh gurdwara at Naulakha Bazaar in Lahore, Pakistan, which marks the site where over 100,000 Sikh men and women lost their lives in the 18th century. It is located opposite Gurudwara Bhai Taru Singh. Bhai Mani Singh was martyred at this site on 14 June 1738.

See also
 List of Gurudwaras
 Gurdwara Darbar Sahib Kartarpur
 Gurudwara Sis Ganj Sahib
 Hazur Sahib Nanded
 Takht Sri Patna Sahib

References

External links
 Official Website

Religious buildings and structures completed in 1504
Religious buildings and structures with domes
Religious tourism in India
Gurdwaras in Pakistan
18th-century gurdwaras